Allah Wasaya (born 1945) (Urdu: مولانا الله وسايا) is a Pakistani Islamic scholar and one of the leaders of Aalmi Majlis Tahaffuz Khatm-e-Nubuwwat.

Biography
Wasaya born in 1945 to Malik Muhammad Ramzan in Garwan, Bahawalpur. He received his early education at Madrasa Rafiq-ul-Ulema, Basti Faqiran. Then he studied in Jamia Abbasia now Islamia University of Bahawalpur and Jamia Qasim Ul Uloom Multan and "Dora-e-Hadith" from Jamia Makhzan-Al-Ullum Khanpur, Rahim Yar Khan under Abdullah Darkhawasti. In 1968 he connected with Aalmi Majlis Tahaffuz Khatm-e-Nubuwwat. Since 1981 he is serving as a central leader of AMTKN in Head Office Multan.

Literary work
 Tehreek e Khatam e Nubuwwat (1974 – Vol 1)
 Firaaq e Yaraan (2006)
 Tazkirah ShaheedeIslam Maulana Muhammad Yusuf Ludhianvi
 Fitna E Qadiyaniat Ki Niqab Kushaai
 Qadyaniat Defeated in the Parliament

References

Living people
1945 births
Pakistani Islamic religious leaders
Pakistani Sunni Muslim scholars of Islam
Muslim missionaries
People from Bahawalpur District
Islamia University of Bahawalpur alumni
Pakistani religious writers
Deobandis
Aalmi Majlis Tahaffuz Khatm-e-Nubuwwat people
Jamia Qasim Ul Uloom alumni